The Morphettville Park Football Club is a sports club first formed in 1958 and initial games were against sides who had forfeits or byes. The club is mostly known for their Australian rules football team, which joined the Glenelg-South-West District Football Association A2 Division in 1959.

Other sports practised at Morphettville Park are cricket and netball.

History
After winning the A2 Premiership in 1963, Morphettville Park were promoted to the A1 division where they remained until the competition, then known as the Southern Metropolitan Football League, folded at the end of the 1986 season.  Morphettville Park transferred to the Southern Football League with the Marion and Plympton clubs in 1987 and moved to the Adelaide Footy League in 2017 alongside Brighton Districts and Old Scholars Football Club.

Morphettville Park FC has produced one Australian Football League (AFL) player, Tony McGuinness, formerly of Adelaide and Footscray.

Honours
 A-Grade Premiership (2): 
 1963 Glenelg-South-West District Football Association A2
 1990 Southern Football League Division 1

Former Logo

References

External links
 

 
 

Southern Football League (SA) Clubs
Australian rules football clubs in South Australia
1958 establishments in Australia
Australian rules football clubs established in 1958